Milton Klein may refer to:
Milton L. Klein (1910–2007), Canadian politician
Milton M. Klein (1917–2004), American historian

Milton Klein (engineer), (1924– ), American engineer